Rhoda Willis, alias Leslie James, (14 August 1867 – 14 August 1907) was an English baby farmer convicted of murder. She was the last woman to be executed in Wales.

She was born in Sunderland in 1867.

She was sentenced to death at Glamorgan Assizes for murdering the illegitimate child of a single woman named Maud Treasure on 3 June.

While lodging with a Mr and Mrs Wilson at Cardiff, Willis induced them to adopt a child for £1. One day Willis came home drunk and fell out of bed, Mrs Wilson went to her aid and discovered in the bed the dead body of another child wrapped in a parcel. The infant, which had been suffocated, was Maud Treasure's child, which Willis had undertaken to adopt and bring up for £6.

Willis was executed by hanging at Cardiff prison on 14 August 1907, her 40th birthday. She was the only woman to be hanged in Wales in the 20th century and the last baby farmer to be executed.

References

1867 births
1907 deaths
People from Sunderland
Criminals from Tyne and Wear
People convicted of murder by England and Wales
20th-century executions by England and Wales
English people convicted of murder
English murderers of children
Executed people from County Durham
British female murderers
Executed English women
1907 in Wales
People executed for murder
Baby farming